The Spira is a lightweight, fuel-efficient, three-wheeled, two-passenger car designed for the roads of Southeast Asia. 90% of its bodywork is made from a lightweight, reinforced foam. The car weighs only , and has a fuel efficiency of more than 100 mpg. The car's foam contains millions of air cells, and these act as tiny airbags during collisions, which offers protection to the car's occupants, as well as to the pedestrians, bicyclists, and motorcyclists who are very common in the areas where the car is planned to be used. The car's foam can be made from soybeans. The car, which was invented by Lon Ballard, has been entered into the Progressive Insurance Automotive X Prize competition.

References

Three-wheeled motor vehicles